Ruling Lad is a Thoroughbred racehorse who won the New Zealand Derby in 1976.

He produced an extraordinary performance to win the Derby for rider Garry Phillips, but never showed that ability in the rest of his career. In the 15 starts he had after his Derby win, he never finished closer than seventh.

1976 racehorse births
Racehorses bred in New Zealand
Racehorses trained in New Zealand
Thoroughbred family 8-e